Rozwarzyn  is a village in the administrative district of Gmina Nakło nad Notecią, within Nakło County, Kuyavian-Pomeranian Voivodeship, in north-central Poland. It is located in the ethnographic region of Pałuki.

History
During the German occupation (World War II), some Poles from Rozwarzyn were among the victims of a massacre carried out by the German Selbstschutz in nearby Polichno in October 1939 as part of the Intelligenzaktion.

References

Rozwarzyn